Below is a list some streets and piazzas (squares) in Valletta, the capital city of Malta.

Main thoroughfares
Archbishop Street
Battery Street 
Bishop Lane (Sqaq l-Isqof) 
Carmelo Street (Triq Tal-Karmnu) 
Carts Street (Triq il-Karrijiet) 
Castile Place
St Elmo Place
Old Bakery Street
St. Biagio Street (Triq San Bjaġju) 
Boat Street
Bounty Street (Triq l-Għajnuna) 
Bull Street (Triq il-Gendus)
Eagle Street
East Street
Engineers Lane (Sqaq l-Inġinieri)
Felix Street (Triq Feliċ)
G. Cassar Road (Triq Ġirolomu Cassar) 
West Street
Knight Street (Triq il-Kavallier) 
M.A. Vassalli Street (Triq Mikiel Anton Vassalli) 
Mediterranean Street
New Street (Triq il-Ġdida) 
Republic Street 
Old Hospital Street (Triq l-Isptar) 
Old Mint Street (Triq Żekka; alt. Strada Zecca) 
Old Treasury Street (Triq it-Teżorerija)
Old Theater Lane (Sqaq tat-Teatru l-Antik)
Old Theater Street
Ordinance Street (Triq l-Ordinanza)
Great Siege Road
King's Garden Street
Lascaris Wharf (Xatt Lascaris) 
Liesse Hill (Telgħet Liesse)
Lower Barrakka Lane (Sqaq il-Barrakka t'Isfel)
Marsamxett Street
Melita Street
Merchants Street (Triq il-Merkanti; alt. Strada Mercanti) 
Mill Street (Triq il-Mitħna) 
Nelson Avenue (Vjal Nelson)
Nix Mangiari Steps (Taraġ Nix Mangiari)
North Street (Triq it-Tramuntana) 
Pope Pius V Street (Triq il-Papa Piju V) 
Scots Street (M.A.Vassalli; alt. Strada Scozzese)
South Street (Triq Nofsinhar; alt. Strada Mezzodì)
St Andrew's Street (Triq Sant'Andrija)
St Anne's Street (Triq Sant' Anna; alt. Strada Sant'Anna)
St Anthony's Street (Triq Sant'Antnin) 
St Barbara's Bastion (Is-Sur ta' Santa Barbara)
St Charles Street (Triq San Karlu; alt. Strada San Carlo)
St Dominic's Street (Triq San Duminku; alt. Strada San Domenico)
St Fredrick's Street (Triq San Federiku; alt. Strada San Federico) 
St George's Street (Triq San Ġorġ)
St John's Street (Triq San Ġwann; alt. Strada San Giovanni)
St John's Cavalier Street (Triq il-Kavallier ta' San Ġwann) 
St Joseph Street (Triq San Ġużepp) 
St Lucy Street (Triq Santa Luċija) 
St Michael's Street (Triq San Mikiel) 
St Nicholas Street (Triq San Nikola) 
St Paul Street (Triq San Pawl; Strada San Paolo)
St Patrick's Street (Triq San Patrizju)
St Sebastian Street 
St Ursula Street (Triq Sant' Orsola; alt. Strada Sant'Orsola) 
Zachary Street (Triq Żakkarija; Strada Zaccaria)
Christopher Street
St Mark Street
Spur Street
Fountain Street (Triq l-Għajn) 
Steps Street (Triq it-Turġien) 
Strait Street (Triq id-Dejqa; alt. Strada Stretta) 
Quarry Wharf
St Dominic Street
Toni Bajada Lane (Sqaq Toni Bajada)
Victory Street (Triq il-Vitorja)
Wells Street (Triq l-Ibjar)

Piazzas
A piazza is a public square. A number of formerly existing square in Valletta no longer exist.
St Elmo's Square
St John's Square
St George's Square, also known as Palace Square
Republic Square, also known as Queen's Square  and 
Great Siege Square
Freedom Square
Jean De Valette Square (Misraħ De Valette) 
Castille Square, also known for a while as 
Independence Square
Mattia Preti Square

Bastions

Abercrombie's Bastion (Is-Sur ta' Abercrombie) 
Ball's Bastion (Is-Sur ta' Ball)
Castile Bastion (Is-Sur ta' Castile)
English Curtain (Is-Sur tal-Ingliżi)
French Curtain (Is-Sur tal-Franċiżi) 
German Curtain (Is-Sur tal-Ġermaniżi) 
Lascaris Bastion (Is-Sur ta' Lascaris) 
Lower Castile Bastion (Is-Sur ta' Isfel ta' Castile)
St Barbara's Bastion (Is-Sur ta' Santa Barbara)
St Gregory's Bastion (Is-Sur ta' San Girgor) 
St James Bastion (Is-Sur ta' San Ġakbu) 
St John's Bastion (Is-Sur ta' San Ġwann) 
St Lazarus Bastion (Is-Sur ta' San Lażżru) 
St Michael Bastion (Is-Sur ta' San Mikiel)
St Sebastian's Bastion (Is-Sur ta' San Bastjan)

Historical names of Valletta's streets and squares

References

Valletta
Geography of Valletta
Valletta
Valletta
Valletta
Streets